Hung Up is a 1973 French film directed by Édouard Luntz. The film stars Patricia Gozzi, Julie Dassin, Jany Holt, and Calvin Lockhart.

The film was Gozzi's final film.

References

External links 
 

1973 films
French drama films
Films directed by Édouard Luntz
1970s French-language films
1973 drama films
1970s English-language films
1973 multilingual films
French multilingual films
1970s French films